Masovian Regional is statistical area of the Nomenclature of Territorial Units for Statistics, level NUTS 2. It includes all of  Masovian Voivodeship excluding Warsaw metropolitan area.

Economy 
The Gross domestic product (GDP) of the region was 30.2 billion € in 2021, accounting for only around 5% of Polish economic output. GDP per capita was around €12,900 .

References 

NUTS 2 statistical regions of the European Union